Hypnotize may refer to:

 Hypnosis, a state of enhanced capacity to respond to suggestion
 Hypnotize (album), 2005 album by System of a Down
 "Hypnotize" (System of a Down song), title track from the above album
 "Hypnotize" (The Notorious B.I.G. song), by Notorious B.I.G. from the 1997 album Life After Death
 "Hypnotize", a song by Scritti Politti, from the 1985 album Cupid & Psyche '85
 "Hypnotize", a song by Audioslave, from the 2002 album Audioslave
 "Hypnotize", a song by The White Stripes, from the 2003 album Elephant
 "Hypnotize", a song by soulDecision, from the 2004 album Shady Satin Drug
 "Hypnotise", a song by Way Out West from the 2001 album Intensify

See also
 Hypnotized (disambiguation)